Justice Myers may refer to:

David Myers (Indiana judge) (1859–1955), associate justice of the Indiana Supreme Court
George S. Myers (judge) (1881–1940), associate justice of the Ohio Supreme Court
Henry L. Myers (1862–1943), associate justice of the Montana Supreme Court
Louis Wescott Myers (1872–1960), chief justice of the California Supreme Court
Quincy Alden Myers (1853–1921), associate justice of the Indiana Supreme Court
Walter Myers Jr. (1914–1967), associate justice of the Indiana Supreme Court

See also
Judge Myers (disambiguation)